The Chinese Ambassador to Sierra Leone is the official representative of the People's Republic of China to the Republic of Sierra Leone.

History
From 28 September 1963 to 20 August 1971, the Republic of China and Sierra Leone maintained diplomatic relations.

On 29 July 1971, the People's Republic of China and Sierra Leone established diplomatic relations.

List of representatives

References 

 
Sierra Leone
China